Pseudacris (commonly known as the chorus frogs) is a genus of frogs in the family Hylidae found in  North America ranging from the Pacific coastline to the Atlantic.

The name of the genus comes from the Greek pseudes (false) and akris (locust), probably a reference to the repeated rasping trill of most chorus frogs, which is similar to that of the insect. 
It could also mean ‘false Acris’, distinguishing it from another frog genus.

Taxonomy
The species in this genus are disputed. Molecular genetic research shows little consistency due to hybridization between species, making taxonomic organization difficult.

The number of species in this genus is controversial, but Frost et al. list 19 species (all shown here), and AmphibiaWeb lists 17 species (P. hypochondriaca and P. sierra are not recognized):

Distribution and habitat 
Chorus frogs live anywhere in North America from southern Alaska to southern Baja California, and from the Pacific to the Atlantic.

References

External links
  [web application]. 2008. Berkeley, California: Pseudacris. AmphibiaWeb, available at http://amphibiaweb.org/. (Accessed: Apr 23, 2008).
  taxon Pseudacris at http://www.eol.org.
  Taxon Pseudacris at https://www.itis.gov/index.html. (Accessed: Apr 23, 2008).
  Taxon Pseudacris at http://data.gbif.org/welcome.htm 

Hylidae
 
Amphibians of North America
Taxa named by Leopold Fitzinger